Blair is an unincorporated community in Roane County, Tennessee, United States.

Blair is where the Southern Appalachia Railway Museum's railroad line connects with the Norfolk Southern railroad.

References

Unincorporated communities in Roane County, Tennessee
Unincorporated communities in Tennessee